The 2019 Russian Athletics Championships was held from 24–27 July at the Olympic Stadium in Cheboksary. It was the seventh time that the capital of the Chuvash Republic hosted the event. The four-day competition featured 40 track and field events and was attended by 731 athletes from 72 regions of the country.

Championships
During 2018, Russian championships were held in various cities in individual athletics disciplines:
 30 March — Russian Championships in mountain running (uphill) (Zheleznovodsk)
 26 April — Russian Championships in cross country running (spring) (Suzdal)
 5 May — Russian Championships in marathon (Kazan)
 10—11 May — Russian Championships in 24-hour run (Moscow)
 18 May — Russian Championships in mountain running (uphill-downhill) (Toksovo)
 14—16 June — Russian Championships in combined track and field events (Smolensk)
 15—16 June — Russian Championships in racewalking (Cheboksary)
 6 July — Russian Championships in trail running (Karpinsk)
 8—9 September — Russian Championships in relay (Adlersky City District)
 15 September — Russian Championships in half marathon (Yaroslavl)
 15 September — Russian Championships in 100 kilometres (Bryansk)
 12—13 October — Russian Championships in cross country running (autumn) (Orenburg)
 30 October — Russian Championships in mountain running (long-distance) (Krasnaya Polyana)

Track and field

Men

Women

Mountain Running
The 20th Russian Mountain Running Championship (uphill) was held on 30 March at Mount Beshtau in Zheleznovodsk, Stavropol Krai. A total of 72 participants (46 men and 26 women) from 25 regions of the country started the competition.

Men

Women

Spring Cross Country
The 2019 Russian Spring Cross Championships was held on 26 April in the city of Suzdal, Vladimir Oblast. The course was in a looped format on a kilometre-long course with numerous turns. Four senior races were attended by 97 runners (53 men and 44 women) from 35 regions of Russia. For the first time since 2004, the spring cross championship was not held in Zhukovsky, Moscow Oblast. Suzdal became only the fifth city to host the country's championship in cross country running.

Men

Women

Marathon
The 2019 Russian Marathon Championships was held on 5 May in the city of Kazan as part of the Kazan Marathon. The course had an incline in the first half around the Millennium Bridge, but the rest of the course was flat.

Prior to the event, Stepan Kiselev and Iskander Yadgarov had promoted the idea of a duel between the two on social media, with the organizers of the marathon casting it as a professional versus amateur contest. Yadgarov, a programmer at Yandex, said he would take on professional Russian marathon runners, with national champion Kiselev serving as his role model. Competitions were held in warm and sunny weather (about 20 degrees Celsius at the finish). A total of 81 marathon runners (49 men and 32 women) from 34 regions of Russia were at the start line. The reigning champion, Alexei Reunkov, did not defend his title due to an injured Achilles tendon.

Men

Women

24-hour run
The Russian 24-hour Championships was held on 10–11 May 2019 at the Iskra Stadium in Moscow as part of the XXVIII Super Day Marathon. A total of 53 athletes from 28 regions of Russia (37 men and 16 women) took to the start. For the first time in the history of the championships of Russia, all three women medalists showed results above 230 km, and four participants fulfilled the standard of an international-class master of sports (225 km). The winners were  24-hour run debutants Valery Dolzhikov (257,061 m) and Tatyana Fomina (233,380 m).

Men

Women

Mountain Running (uphill and downhill)
The 21st Russian Mountain Running Championship (uphill and downhill) was held on 18 May in the village of Toksovo, Leningrad Oblast. Competitions were held at the sports base of the local Military Institute of Physical Culture, where a 1.7 km long lap with a height difference of 200 m. A total of 59 participants (34 men and 25 women) from 14 regions of Russia came to the start. Ruslan Khoroshilov became the first man to win the national titles in all three types of mountain running, having won the uphill race in 2015 and the long distance race in 2017.

Men

Women

Combined Events
The Russian Combined Events Championships were determined on 14–16 June in Smolensk. The competition was attended by 39 athletes (28 men and 11 women) from 18 regions of the country. The championship was held at the stadium of the Smolensk Academy of Physical Culture.

Men

Women

Race Walking
The Russian Race Walking Championships was held on 15–16 June in Cheboksary along the city's promenade. A total of 65 athletes (39 men and 26 women) from 13 regions of the country took part in the competition. Claudia Afanasyeva defended her women's 50 km walk title in 3:57.08, which exceeded the world record of 3:59.15 by Liu Hong, but was not ratified due to Russia's international ban due to doping and the absence of foreign judges.

In February 2019, three of the four Russian walking champions (Shirobokov, Sharypov, Afanasyeva) received warnings from RUSADA for forbidden cooperation with the trainer Viktor Chegin, who was suspended for life in 2016 for numerous doping violations of his athletes. Another champion, Elena Lashmanova, trained for a long time under the guidance of Chegin, and from 2014 to 2016 she was suspended from the competition due to a positive doping test.

Men

Women

Trail running
The inaugural Russian Trail Championships was held on 6 July in Karpinsk, Sverdlovsk Oblast, as part of the 24th Konzhak Mountain Marathon. In 2015, the IAAF officially recognized trail running as an athletics discipline and the Russian Ministry of Sports followed the body's lead with a national-level decision in 2017.

Participants overcame a 38.5 km long track laid along the slopes of Konzhakovsky Kamen Mountain. A total of 28 runners (20 men and 8 women) from 11 regions of the country were entered. Around 1,400 people entered the non-championship element of the race and the official championship winners were beaten by Yevgeny Markov (2:57.54), Antonina Yushina (3:35.13) and Anna Medvedeva (3:58.58), who had not been nominated by their region.

Men

Women

Relay
The Russian Relay Championships was held from 8–9 September in Adlersky City District at the stadium of the Yunost sports complex.

Men

Women

Half marathon
The Russian Half Marathon Championships was held on 15 September in Yaroslavl as part of the VI Golden Ring Half Marathon. The race started and finished in Strelka Park and had a 10.55 km lon switchback course through the city. A total of 72 athletes from 32 regions of the country (38 men and 34 women) took to the start. Competitions were held in cool weather (about 12 degrees Celsius).

Men

Women

100 km
The Russian 100 km Championships was held on 15 September in Bryansk as part of the Bryansk Forest Running Festival. Competitions took place in the Central Park of Culture and Rest on a kilometre-long circular circuit. Participants covered 100 laps in cool and clear weather (7 degrees Celsius at the start, 15 degrees at the finish); the second half of the distance was affected by a strong wind. A total of 22 athletes from 17 regions of the country (13 men and 9 women) took to the start.

Men

Women

Autumn Cross Country
The Russian Autumn Cross Country Championships was held from 12–13 October in Orenburg. Two senior races were attended by 59 runners from 24 regions of Russia (38 men and 21 women).

Men

Women

Long-distance Mountain Running
The 13th Russian Long Distance Mountain Running Championship took place on 30 October in Krasnaya Polyana, Krasnodar Krai. A total of 25 participants (12 men and 13 women) from 10 regions of Russia entered the races.

Men

Women

References

Results
 
 

Russian Athletics Championships
Russian Athletics Championships
Russian Athletics Championships
Russian Athletics Championships
Sport in Cheboksary